Cureus, also known as the Cureus Journal of Medical Science, is an open access general medical journal and is among the growing number of journals using prepublication and post publication peer review. It is also the first academic journal which provides authors with step-by-step templates for them to use to write their papers. The journal's founders are John R. Adler (Stanford University), who serves as one of two editors-in-chief, and Alexander Muacevic (University of Munich) who serves as the second editor-in-chief.

History and publication process
Cureus was originally started as PeerEMed in 2009, and was re-launched under its current name in December 2012. Under its system, after an article is published, anyone can review it, but the reviews of experts will be given a higher score. Its peer-review process involves asking experts to review a given article in a few days, which results in its peer reviews taking much less time than those of most other journals do. Adler told Retraction Watch in 2015 that "Yes Cureus has an unusually fast review process, which is an important part of the journal’s philosophy. We believe that post publication peer review, a focus of our journal through commenting and our unique SIQ process, is potentially a more powerful way to discern truth." As of December 2022, Cureus became part of the Springer Nature group of journals.

References

External links

Publications established in 2009
General medical journals
Creative Commons-licensed journals
Open access journals
English-language journals
Irregular journals